Bachern station is a railway station in the Bachern district in the municipality of Bergkirchen, located in the Dachau district in Upper Bavaria, Germany.

References

Munich S-Bahn stations
Railway stations in Bavaria
Railway stations in Germany opened in 1912
Buildings and structures in Dachau (district)